Burchula or Karaugom ( Qæræwgomy xox) is a peak in the Greater Caucasus Mountain Range, located inside in the  Alaniya National Park of North Ossetia–Alania on the border with Oni Municipality of Georgia.

Geography  
The peak is mainly made up of pre-Cambrian granites.  
Burchula is covered by ice and glaciers at higher elevations while the lower part of the mountain consists of steep and jagged cliffs.  
The glacier Southern Notsarula descends from the mountain's western flank and is the source of the Notsarula River (tributary of Kotsaniara river,  left tributary of the Rioni).  The Bokho Glacier descends from Burchula's southeastern flank.

References 

Burchula
Burchula
Four-thousanders of the Caucasus